Kamalo is a town in western Ivory Coast. It is a sub-prefecture of Séguéla Department in Worodougou Region, Woroba District.

Kamalo was a commune until March 2012, when it became one of 1126 communes nationwide that were abolished.
In 2014, the population of the sub-prefecture of Kamalo was 9,783.

Villages
The twelve villages of the sub-prefecture of Kamalo and their population in 2014 are:

Notes

Sub-prefectures of Worodougou
Former communes of Ivory Coast